Events in the year 1234 in Norway.

Incumbents
Monarch: Haakon IV Haakonsson

Events

Arts and literature

Births
Christina of Norway, Infanta of Castile (died 1262).

Deaths
Inga of Varteig, mother of king Haakon IV of Norway (born c. 1185)

References

Norway